Conotalopia is a genus of sea snails, marine gastropod molluscs in the family Trochidae, the top shells.

Species
Species within the genus Conotalopia include:
 Conotalopia henniana (Melvill, 1891)
 Conotalopia hilarula (Yokoyama, 1926)
 Conotalopia minima (Golikov, 1967)
 Conotalopia musiva (Gould, 1861)
 Conotalopia mustelina (Gould, 1861)
 Conotalopia ornata (G. B. Sowerby III, 1903)
 Conotalopia sematensis (Oyama, 1942)
 Conotalopia singaporensis (Pilsbry, 1889)
 Conotalopia tropicalis (Hedley, 1907)
Species brought into synonymy
 Conotalopia glaphyrella (Melvill, J.C. & R. Standen, 1895): synonym of Ethminolia glaphyrella (Melvill & Standen, 1895)
 Conotalopia marmorata (Pease, 1861): synonym of Calliotrochus marmoreus (Pease, 1861)

References

 Higo, S., Callomon, P. & Goto, Y. (1999) Catalogue and Bibliography of the Marine Shell-Bearing Mollusca of Japan. Elle Scientific Publications, Yao, Japan, 749 pp

 
Trochidae
Gastropod genera